Tiger Woods 99: PGA Tour Golf (also known as just Tiger Woods 99) is a sports video game developed by Adrenalin Entertainment and published by EA Sports for Microsoft Windows and PlayStation in 1998.

Development
In mid-1997 EA Sports signed an exclusive deal with Tiger Woods to use his name and likeness on their line of golf games. EA Sports reportedly paid approximately $10 million (equivalent to $ million in ) for the rights, which spanned several years and multiple gaming platforms.

Easter egg
The first 100,000 pressings of Tiger Woods 99 for the PlayStation contained an Easter egg. If the disc is loaded into a computer, directories for files of the game would appear along with a QuickTime file titled ZZDUMMY.DAT. When played, it is a VHS recording of Jesus vs. Santa by Trey Parker and Matt Stone, commonly recognized as a precursor to South Park. The episode was apparently sneaked onto the disc by an employee at Electronic Arts, and according to the metadata it was converted four days before being added to the disc. EA recalled these copies of the game a few months after it was released, calling the episode "objectionable to consumers", and subsequent versions did not contain the file.

Reception

The PC version received "favorable" reviews, while the PlayStation version received "average" reviews, according to the review aggregation website GameRankings. Next Generation called the former "a sharp golf game, compatible with last June's PGA Tour Pro software updates and course discs."

References

External links
 

1998 video games
EA Sports games
Golf video games
PlayStation (console) games
Tiger Woods video games
Video games developed in Canada
Windows games